Karanjia (Sl. No.: 30) is a Vidhan Sabha constituency of Mayurbhanj district, Odisha.

Area of this constituency includes Karanjia, Karanjia block, Thakurmunda block and 9 GPs (Padmapokhari, Ramachandrapur, Labnyadeipur, Dewanbahali, Ranipokhari, Sarat, Nota, Sardiha and Kalamgadia) of Kaptipada block.

In 2014 election Biju Janata Dal candidate Bijay Kumar Naik, defeated Bharatiya Janata Party Jyostna Bhansingh   by a margin of 13,551 votes.

Elected Members

15 elections held during 1957 to 2019. List of members elected from Karanjia Vidhan Sabha constituency are:
2019: (30): Basanti Hembram (BJD)
2014: (30): Bijay Kumar Naik (BJD)
2009: (30): Bijay Kumar Naik (BJD)
2004: (1): Ajit Hembram  (BJD)
2000: (1): Padma Charan Haiburu (Independent)
1995: (1): Raghunath Hembram (Janata Dal)
1990: (1): Raghunath Hembram (Janata Dal)
1985: (1): Karunakar Naik (Indian National Congress) 
1980: (1): Raghunath Hembram (Janata Party (Secular)) 
1977: (1): Raghunath Hembram (Janata Party) 
1974: (1): Karunakar Naik (Congress)
1971: (1): Prafulla Kumar Das (Swatantra)
1967: (1): Prafulla Kumar Das (Swatantra) 
1961: (134): Pravakar Behera (Congress) 
1957: (96): Nalini Chandra Bhanja Deo (Ganatantra Parishad)

Results

2019

2014

2009

Notes

References

Politics of Mayurbhanj district
Assembly constituencies of Odisha